Laclede's Landing is a St. Louis MetroLink station. It is located near Laclede's Landing and Gateway Arch National Park in downtown St. Louis, Missouri.

Laclede's Landing is the easternmost station in Missouri, located on the lower deck of the Eads Bridge before crossing the Mississippi River into Illinois. The station sits at the east portal of the historic St. Louis Freight Tunnel. Constructed in 1874 to carry trains between the Eads Bridge and the Mill Creek Valley rail yards, it saw its last train (Amtrak) in 1974. Refurbishment of the tunnels began in 1991 in preparation for the opening of MetroLink, which uses the original route to connect Illinois and Missouri via downtown St. Louis.

The station is well known for its historic brickwork that frames the Gateway Arch from the platform level. In 2013, Metro's Arts in Transit program commissioned the work Build by Beliz Brother for installation in the station. The aluminum panels are meant to represent the drawings James Eads used to construct his namesake bridge.

Station layout
The station consists of a single island platform with an entrance on either end: one on Rue de L'Eglise (2nd Street) at the west end with stairs and an elevator and one on 1st Street at the east end with only stairs.

References

External links
 St. Louis Metro

MetroLink stations in St. Louis
Railway stations in the United States opened in 1993
Red Line (St. Louis MetroLink)
Blue Line (St. Louis MetroLink)